Siraj Sikder (27 October 1944 – 2 January 1975) was a Bangladeshi revolutionary politician.

Early life
Sikder was born on 27 October 1944 in Bhedarganj, Shariatpur District, East Bengal. His father was Abdur Razzaq Sikder, and belonged to a Bengali Muslim zamindar family in Chhaygaon. After passing the matriculation examination from Barisal Zilla School in 1959, he was admitted into Barisal Brojomohun College in 1961 for I.Sc. He obtained an engineering degree from the East Pakistan University of Engineering and Technology (now BUET) in 1967.

While he was a student he became a member of East Pakistan Student Union. In 1967, he was elected vice-president of the central committee of Student Union and later that year he joined the C & B Department of the government as an engineer. Three months later he left his job to start a private company, named Engineering Limited in Teknaf.

Political activity
On 8 January 1968, along with like-minded activists, Sikder formed a clandestine organisation named Purba Bangla Sramik Andolon (East Bengal Workers Movement EBWM) with an objective to lead a struggle against the revisionism of the existing "Communist" organisations and to form a revolutionary Communist Party. This initiative brought forward a thesis that East Bengal is a colony of Pakistan and that the principal contradiction in the society is between the bureaucratic bourgeoisie and feudalists of Pakistan on one hand, and the people of East Bengal on the other hand. Only the independence struggle to form an "independent, democratic, peaceful, non-aligned, progressive" People's Republic of East Bengal, free also from the oppression of US imperialism, Soviet social-imperialism and Indian Expansionism could lead the society forward towards socialism and communism. In late 1968, Sikder left his job to establish the Mao Tse Tung Research Center in Dhaka but it was later closed down by the Pakistani government. Sikder became a lecturer at the Technical Training College in Dhaka.

In the meantime of war, at a liberated base area named Pearabagan at Bhimruly in Jhalokati District in the southern part of the country, on 3 June 1971, Sikder founded a new party named Purba Banglar Sarbahara Party (Proletarian Party of East Bengal) by ideology of Marxism and Mao Tsetung Thought (not "Maoism", during the 1960s the followers of Mao-line used to identify their ideology as Marxism-Leninism-Mao Tse-tung Thought). At the beginning of the war, he went to Barisal and he declared that as a free living space and making it his base attempted to initiate his revolution throughout other places. After the Independence of Bangladesh he turned against the Sheikh Mujib government. In April 1973, he formed Purba Banglar Jatiya Mukti Front (East Bengal United Liberation Front) and declared war on the Bangladeshi Government. Under his leadership, the Sarbahara party carried out attacks against money lenders and landlords.

Death
In 1975, Sikder was arrested at Hali Shahr in Chittagong by the intelligence force of the government. He was killed in police custody on 3 January 1975 on his way from Dhaka Airport to the Rakkhi Bahini Camp at Savar. Anthony Mascarenhas narrated in his book Bangladesh: A Legacy of Blood that Siraj's sister Shamim Sikder accused Sheikh Mujib of killing her brother.

References

External links
 Selected works of Siraj Sikder in English
 Conscience, matter, reflection and Siraj Sikder

Bangladeshi activists
1975 deaths
1944 births
Maoists
Maoist theorists
Bangladeshi communists
Bangladesh University of Engineering and Technology alumni
People from Bhedarganj Upazila
Mukti Bahini personnel
Bangladeshi Marxists
20th-century Bangladeshi philosophers